Diaulula punctuolata is a species of sea slug or dorid nudibranch, a marine gastropod mollusk in the family Discodorididae.

Distribution

Description
The maximum recorded body length is 100 mm.

Ecology
Minimum recorded depth is 0 m. Maximum recorded depth is 100 m.

References

External links

Discodorididae
Gastropods described in 1837